Ian McHugh is an Australian writer of speculative short fiction.

Biography
McHugh's first story was published in 2004, entitled "The Alchemical Automaton Blues" which was published in Andromeda Spaceways Inflight Magazine #15. His first win came with his story "Bitter Dreams" which won the 2008 Writers of the Future grand prize. It was also a nominee for the writers of the Future 3rd quarter at the same awards and was a short-list nominee for the 2008 Aurealis Award for best horror short story. In 2009 McHugh's "Once a Month, On a Sunday" was a joint-winner for the 2009 Aurealis Award for best fantasy short story. McHugh currently lives in Canberra, Australia and is a member of the Canberra Speculative Fiction Guild. At this very moment, he is tutoring a Professional Orientation Class.

Bibliography

Collections
 Angel dust (2014)
Stories

 
"The Last Day of Rea" (2006) in All Star Stories presents: Twenty Epics
"Grace" (2007) in Andromeda Spaceways Inflight Magazine #28 (ed. Zara Baxter)
"The Dao of Stones" (2007) in Challenging Destiny #24
"Requiem in D-minor (for prions, whale and burning bush)" (2007) in Hub #24
"The Greatest Adventure of All" (2007) in Coyote Wild, Autumn 2007
"Bitter Dreams" (2008) in Writers of the Future XXIV (ed. Algis Budrys)
"Stiletto" (2009) in GUD #4
"Angel Dust" (2009) in Clockwork Phoenix 2
"Sleepless in the House of Ye" (2009) in Asimov's Science Fiction July 2009 (ed. Sheila Williams)
"Once a Month, On a Sunday" (2009) in Andromeda Spaceways Inflight Magazine #40
"Songdogs" (2009) in Beneath Ceaseless Skies #27
"The Promises of Avalae" (2010) in Blood & Devotion
"Annicca" (2010) in Greatest Uncommon Denominator #6
"Cockatoo" (TBA) in All Hallows
"The Godbreaker and Unggubudh the Mountain" (2012) in Light Touch Paper, Stand Clear (ed. Edwina Harvey and Simon Petrie)

Awards and nominations
Aurealis Awards
Best fantasy short story
2009: Win: "Once a Month, On a Sunday"
Best horror short story
2008: Nomination: "Bitter Dreams"
Best young-adult short story
2009: Win: "Once a Month, On a Sunday"

Writers of the Future
Writers of the Future grand prize
2008: Win: "Bitter Dreams"
Writers of the Future 3rd quarter
2008: Nominee: "Bitter Dreams"

Notes

External links
Official site

Year of birth missing (living people)
Living people
Asimov's Science Fiction people
Australian fantasy writers
Australian male short story writers
Australian science fiction writers